The 1977 Pittsburgh Pirates season was the 96th season of the Pittsburgh Pirates franchise; their 91st in the National League. The Pirates finished second in the National League East with a record of 96–66.

Offseason 
 November 5, 1976: Manny Sanguillén was traded by the Pirates to the Oakland Athletics for manager Chuck Tanner.
 December 10, 1976: Richie Zisk and Silvio Martínez were traded by the Pirates to the Chicago White Sox for Goose Gossage and Terry Forster.
 March 15, 1977: Rick Langford, Tony Armas, Doug Bair, Dave Giusti, Doc Medich, and Mitchell Page were traded by the Pirates to the Oakland Athletics for Phil Garner, Tommy Helms, and Chris Batton.

Regular season 
 May 11: Atlanta Braves owner Ted Turner appointed himself manager of the team before a game against the Pirates. After losing the game 2–1, Turner stepped down.
June 30: Willie Stargell hits his 400th career home run versus Philadelphia Phillies.

Season standings

Record vs. opponents

Game log

|- bgcolor="ffbbbb"
| 1 || April 7 || Cardinals || 6–12 || Denny || Reuss (0–1) || — || 35,186 || 0–1
|- bgcolor="ffbbbb"
| 2 || April 9 || Cardinals || 2–8 || Forsch || Kison (0–1) || — || 6,719 || 0–2
|- bgcolor="ffbbbb"
| 3 || April 10 || Cardinals || 7–8 || Carroll || Rooker (0–1) || Urrea || 5,223 || 0–3
|- bgcolor="ccffcc"
| 4 || April 12 || Expos || 2–1 || Gossage (1–0) || McEnaney || — || 4,042 || 1–3
|- bgcolor="ccffcc"
| 5 || April 13 || Expos || 3–0 || Kison (1–1) || Rogers || — || 4,586 || 2–3
|- bgcolor="ccffcc"
| 6 || April 15 || @ Cardinals || 7–0 || Rooker (1–1) || Falcone || — || 41,226 || 3–3
|- bgcolor="ccffcc"
| 7 || April 16 || @ Cardinals || 3–1 || Candelaria (1–0) || Rasmussen || Gossage (1) || 12,513 || 4–3
|- bgcolor="ffbbbb"
| 8 || April 17 || @ Cardinals || 3–4 || Denny || Reuss (0–2) || Urrea || 28,574 || 4–4
|- bgcolor="ffbbbb"
| 9 || April 18 || @ Expos || 5–6 (14) || Atkinson || Jones (0–1) || — || 10,911 || 4–5
|- bgcolor="ffbbbb"
| 10 || April 19 || @ Expos || 0–6 || Stanhouse || Demery (0–1) || — || 10,062 || 4–6
|- bgcolor="ccffcc"
| 11 || April 20 || @ Expos || 8–6 || Rooker (2–1) || Hannahs || Tekulve (1) || 12,607 || 5–6
|- bgcolor="ccffcc"
| 12 || April 22 || @ Mets || 4–3 || Tekulve (1–0) || Myrick || — || 19,495 || 6–6
|- bgcolor="ccffcc"
| 13 || April 23 || @ Mets || 6–5 || Gossage (2–0) || Sadecki || — || 9,040 || 7–6
|- bgcolor="ccffcc"
| 14 || April 26 || Phillies || 5–0 || Candelaria (2–0) || Christenson || Gossage (2) || 6,726 || 8–6
|- bgcolor="ccffcc"
| 15 || April 27 || Phillies || 7–3 || Kison (2–1) || Twitchell || — || 7,054 || 9–6
|- bgcolor="ffbbbb"
| 16 || April 29 || Astros || 3–11 || Bannister || Reuss (0–3) || — || 7,186 || 9–7
|- bgcolor="ccffcc"
| 17 || April 30 || Astros || 10–0 || Rooker (3–1) || Konieczny || — || 6,540 || 10–7
|-

|- bgcolor="ccffcc"
| 18 || May 1 || Astros || 4–3 (10) || Gossage (3–0) || Forsch || — || 25,371 || 11–7
|- bgcolor="ccffcc"
| 19 || May 2 || @ Braves || 11–1 || Kison (3–1) || Capra || — || 9,148 || 12–7
|- bgcolor="ccffcc"
| 20 || May 3 || @ Braves || 8–7 (11) || Tekulve (2–0) || Niekro || Jackson (1) || 7,977 || 13–7
|- bgcolor="ccffcc"
| 21 || May 4 || @ Braves || 8–0 || Demery (1–1) || LaCorte || — || 3,890 || 14–7
|- bgcolor="ccffcc"
| 22 || May 6 || Reds || 6–3 || Candelaria (3–0) || Billingham || Gossage (3) || 16,258 || 15–7
|- bgcolor="ccffcc"
| 23 || May 7 || Reds || 12–10 || Forster (1–0) || Zachry || Tekulve (2) || 16,799 || 16–7
|- bgcolor="ccffcc"
| 24 || May 8 || Reds || 6–4 || Jones (1–1) || Norman || Gossage (4) || 27,003 || 17–7
|- bgcolor="ccffcc"
| 25 || May 10 || Braves || 3–0 || Rooker (4–1) || Capra || Tekulve (3) ||  || 18–7
|- bgcolor="ccffcc"
| 26 || May 10 || Braves || 2–1 || Demery (2–1) || Collins || Gossage (5) || 5,713 || 19–7
|- bgcolor="ccffcc"
| 27 || May 11 || Braves || 2–1 || Candelaria (4–0) || Niekro || Gossage (6) || 6,816 || 20–7
|- bgcolor="ffbbbb"
| 28 || May 12 || Braves || 1–6 || Leon || Kison (3–2) || — || 10,161 || 20–8
|- bgcolor="ffbbbb"
| 29 || May 13 || @ Astros || 0–3 || Lemongello || Reuss (0–4) || Forsch || 10,512 || 20–9
|- bgcolor="ccffcc"
| 30 || May 14 || @ Astros || 6–2 || Demery (3–1) || Andujar || Gossage (7) || 25,152 || 21–9
|- bgcolor="ccffcc"
| 31 || May 15 || @ Astros || 3–1 || Tekulve (3–0) || Richard || — || 9,340 || 22–9
|- bgcolor="ccffcc"
| 32 || May 17 || @ Reds || 3–0 || Candelaria (5–0) || Billingham || Gossage (8) || 30,575 || 23–9
|- bgcolor="ffbbbb"
| 33 || May 18 || @ Reds || 3–8 || Norman || Reuss (0–5) || Borbon || 28,011 || 23–10
|- bgcolor="ccffcc"
| 34 || May 19 || Dodgers || 6–5 (10) || Gossage (4–0) || Hough || — || 17,988 || 24–10
|- bgcolor="ffbbbb"
| 35 || May 20 || Dodgers || 1–6 || Hooton || Demery (3–2) || — || 34,943 || 24–11
|- bgcolor="ffbbbb"
| 36 || May 21 || Dodgers || 3–4 || John || Rooker (4–2) || — || 32,674 || 24–12
|- bgcolor="ccffcc"
| 37 || May 22 || Dodgers || 11–4 || Candelaria (6–0) || Sutton || — || 30,583 || 25–12
|- bgcolor="ccffcc"
| 38 || May 24 || Mets || 5–2 || Reuss (1–5) || Matlack || Forster (1) || 9,309 || 26–12
|- bgcolor="ffbbbb"
| 39 || May 27 || @ Cubs || 2–4 || Bonham || Candelaria (6–1) || Sutter || 14,593 || 26–13
|- bgcolor="ffbbbb"
| 40 || May 28 || @ Cubs || 3–6 || Reuschel || Rooker (4–3) || Sutter || 34,779 || 26–14
|- bgcolor="ffbbbb"
| 41 || May 29 || @ Cubs || 2–3 || Hernandez || Gossage (4–1) || Sutter || 39,517 || 26–15
|- bgcolor="ffbbbb"
| 42 || May 30 || @ Phillies || 4–6 || Carlton || Kison (3–3) || — || 32,253 || 26–16
|- bgcolor="ffbbbb"
| 43 || May 31 || @ Phillies || 5–6 || Reed || Tekulve (3–1) || — || 23,731 || 26–17
|-

|- bgcolor="ccffcc"
| 44 || June 1 || @ Phillies || 3–0 (8) || Candelaria (7–1) || Christenson || — || 28,234 || 27–17
|- bgcolor="ccffcc"
| 45 || June 3 || Cubs || 5–0 || Rooker (5–3) || Burris || — || 20,152 || 28–17
|- bgcolor="ffbbbb"
| 46 || June 4 || Cubs || 3–4 || Krukow || Reuss (1–6) || Sutter || 26,202 || 28–18
|- bgcolor="ccffcc"
| 47 || June 5 || Cubs || 5–4 || Jones (2–1) || Bonham || Gossage (9) || 51,580 || 29–18
|- bgcolor="ffbbbb"
| 48 || June 6 || Giants || 1–3 (12) || Lavelle || Gossage (4–2) || — || 6,635 || 29–19
|- bgcolor="ffbbbb"
| 49 || June 7 || Giants || 6–7 || Barr || Demery (3–3) || Moffitt || 6,795 || 29–20
|- bgcolor="ffbbbb"
| 50 || June 8 || Giants || 2–3 || Curtis || Rooker (5–4) || Lavelle || 6,995 || 29–21
|- bgcolor="ffffff"
| 51 || June 10 || Padres || 10–7 (11) || Gossage || Fingers || — || 10,499 || 29–21
|- bgcolor="ffbbbb"
| 52 || June 11 || Padres || 1–4 || Shirley || Candelaria (7–2) || Fingers || 11,262 || 29–22
|- bgcolor="ccffcc"
| 53 || June 12 || Padres || 6–1 || Reuss (2–6) || Jones || — ||  || 30–22
|- bgcolor="ccffcc"
| 54 || June 12 || Padres || 7–4 || Kison (4–3) || Sawyer || Gossage (10) || 21,640 || 31–22
|- bgcolor="ffbbbb"
| 55 || June 14 || @ Dodgers || 2–3 || Wall || Gossage (4–3) || — || 36,122 || 31–23
|- bgcolor="ffbbbb"
| 56 || June 15 || @ Dodgers || 1–10 || Rhoden || Jones (2–2) || — || 32,436 || 31–24
|- bgcolor="ffbbbb"
| 57 || June 16 || @ Dodgers || 2–3 (11) || Hough || Gossage (4–4) || — || 34,350 || 31–25
|- bgcolor="ffbbbb"
| 58 || June 17 || @ Giants || 3–4 || Heaverlo || Reuss (2–7) || Lavelle || 4,789 || 31–26
|- bgcolor="ffbbbb"
| 59 || June 18 || @ Giants || 5–7 (12) || Moffitt || Forster (1–1) || — || 10,231 || 31–27
|- bgcolor="ffbbbb"
| 60 || June 19 || @ Giants || 0–8 || Knepper || Rooker (5–5) || — ||  || 31–28
|- bgcolor="ffbbbb"
| 61 || June 19 || @ Giants || 6–8 || Heaverlo || Jackson (0–1) || Moffitt || 23,078 || 31–29
|- bgcolor="ccffcc"
| 62 || June 20 || @ Padres || 5–3 || Tekulve (4–1) || Shirley || Gossage (11) || 26,030 || 32–29
|- bgcolor="ccffcc"
| 63 || June 21 || @ Padres || 9–2 || Candelaria (8–2) || Tomlin || — || 14,265 || 33–29
|- bgcolor="ccffcc"
| 64 || June 22 || @ Padres || 3–1 || Reuss (3–7) || Griffin || Gossage (12) || 14,624 || 34–29
|- bgcolor="ccffcc"
| 65 || June 24 || Expos || 6–5 (10) || Gossage (5–4) || Kerrigan || — || 27,650 || 35–29
|- bgcolor="ccffcc"
| 66 || June 25 || Expos || 10–2 || Kison (5–3) || Brown || — || 7,721 || 36–29
|- bgcolor="ccffcc"
| 67 || June 26 || Expos || 7–4 || Tekulve (5–1) || Rogers || Gossage (13) ||  || 37–29
|- bgcolor="ffbbbb"
| 68 || June 26 || Expos || 3–6 || McEnaney || Gossage (5–5) || — || 20,583 || 37–30
|- bgcolor="ffbbbb"
| 69 || June 27 || @ Cardinals || 1–6 || Falcone || Reuss (3–8) || — || 18,239 || 37–31
|- bgcolor="ffbbbb"
| 70 || June 28 || @ Cardinals || 1–6 || Schultz || Forster (1–2) || — ||  || 37–32
|- bgcolor="ffbbbb"
| 71 || June 28 || @ Cardinals || 3–13 || Underwood || Jackson (0–2) || — || 33,997 || 37–33
|- bgcolor="ccffcc"
| 72 || June 29 || @ Cardinals || 9–1 || Kison (6–3) || Rasmussen || — || 15,248 || 38–33
|- bgcolor="ffbbbb"
| 73 || June 30 || @ Phillies || 1–8 || Carlton || Jones (2–3) || — || 36,162 || 38–34
|-

|- bgcolor="ffbbbb"
| 74 || July 1 || @ Phillies || 6–7 (14) || Garber || Jackson (0–3) || — || 34,640 || 38–35
|- bgcolor="ffbbbb"
| 75 || July 2 || @ Phillies || 3–4 || Brusstar || Reuss (3–9) || Reed || 41,828 || 38–36
|- bgcolor="ffbbbb"
| 76 || July 3 || @ Phillies || 7–11 || Christenson || Kison (6–4) || — || 28,555 || 38–37
|- bgcolor="ccffcc"
| 77 || July 4 || Cardinals || 5–2 || Rooker (6–5) || Underwood || Gossage (14) ||  || 39–37
|- bgcolor="ccffcc"
| 78 || July 4 || Cardinals || 4–3 || Tekulve (6–1) || Eastwick || — || 22,810 || 40–37
|- bgcolor="ffbbbb"
| 79 || July 5 || Cardinals || 3–7 || Forsch || Candelaria (8–3) || — || 10,837 || 40–38
|- bgcolor="ccffcc"
| 80 || July 6 || Cardinals || 11–8 || Tekulve (7–1) || Hrabosky || — || 13,137 || 41–38
|- bgcolor="ccffcc"
| 81 || July 8 || Phillies || 8–7 || Gossage (6–5) || Brusstar || — || 25,200 || 42–38
|- bgcolor="ccffcc"
| 82 || July 9 || Phillies || 9–8 (12) || Forster (2–2) || Garber || — || 19,144 || 43–38
|- bgcolor="ccffcc"
| 83 || July 10 || Phillies || 5–1 || Reuss (4–9) || Lonborg || — ||  || 44–38
|- bgcolor="ccffcc"
| 84 || July 10 || Phillies || 12–10 || Jackson (1–3) || Reed || Gossage (15) || 39,042 || 45–38
|- bgcolor="ffbbbb"
| 85 || July 11 || @ Expos || 2–4 || Bahnsen || Jones (2–4) || — || 19,763 || 45–39
|- bgcolor="ccffcc"
| 86 || July 12 || @ Expos || 5–4 (12) || Gossage (7–5) || Atkinson || — || 14,781 || 46–39
|- bgcolor="ccffcc"
| 87 || July 13 || @ Expos || 6–1 || Candelaria (9–3) || Rogers || — || 22,799 || 47–39
|- bgcolor="ccffcc"
| 88 || July 15 || @ Mets || 7–1 || Rooker (7–5) || Zachry || — ||  || 48–39
|- bgcolor="ffbbbb"
| 89 || July 15 || @ Mets || 1–6 || Espinosa || Reuss (4–10) || — || 20,219 || 48–40
|- bgcolor="ffbbbb"
| 90 || July 16 || @ Mets || 3–5 || Swan || Gossage (7–6) || Apodaca || 24,445 || 48–41
|- bgcolor="ccffcc"
| 91 || July 17 || @ Mets || 3–1 || Candelaria (10–3) || Matlack || Gossage (16) ||  || 49–41
|- bgcolor="ffbbbb"
| 92 || July 17 || @ Mets || 3–9 || Koosman || Forster (2–3) || — || 19,492 || 49–42
|- bgcolor="ccffcc"
| 93 || July 21 || Reds || 6–2 || Reuss (5–10) || Norman || — || 21,713 || 50–42
|- bgcolor="ccffcc"
| 94 || July 22 || Reds || 8–7 (12) || Jackson (2–3) || Billingham || — || 38,888 || 51–42
|- bgcolor="ccffcc"
| 95 || July 23 || Reds || 5–4 || Rooker (8–5) || Capilla || Jackson (2) || 28,625 || 52–42
|- bgcolor="ccffcc"
| 96 || July 24 || Braves || 7–6 (13) || Tekulve (8–1) || Hargan || — || 22,123 || 53–42
|- bgcolor="ccffcc"
| 97 || July 25 || Braves || 6–3 || Reuss (6–10) || Niekro || — || 8,752 || 54–42
|- bgcolor="ccffcc"
| 98 || July 26 || Astros || 3–2 || Candelaria (11–3) || Richard || Gossage (17) || 11,882 || 55–42
|- bgcolor="ccffcc"
| 99 || July 27 || Astros || 3–2 (11) || Tekulve (9–1) || McLaughlin || — || 11,253 || 56–42
|- bgcolor="ccffcc"
| 100 || July 28 || Astros || 9–4 || Rooker (9–5) || Larson || — || 16,400 || 57–42
|- bgcolor="ffbbbb"
| 101 || July 29 || @ Braves || 3–5 || Niekro || Kison (6–5) || — || 9,505 || 57–43
|- bgcolor="ccffcc"
| 102 || July 30 || @ Braves || 10–6 || Forster (3–3) || Collins || — || 19,006 || 58–43
|- bgcolor="ffbbbb"
| 103 || July 31 || @ Braves || 3–8 || Solomon || Candelaria (11–4) || Hanna || 12,467 || 58–44
|-

|- bgcolor="ffbbbb"
| 104 || August 1 || @ Astros || 3–4 (11) || Lemongello || Gossage (7–7) || — || 11,769 || 58–45
|- bgcolor="ccffcc"
| 105 || August 2 || @ Astros || 6–3 (10) || Jackson (3–3) || Larson || — || 15,805 || 59–45
|- bgcolor="ffbbbb"
| 106 || August 3 || @ Astros || 0–3 || Niekro || Kison (6–6) || — || 14,745 || 59–46
|- bgcolor="ccffcc"
| 107 || August 5 || @ Reds || 12–1 || Reuss (7–10) || Norman || — ||  || 60–46
|- bgcolor="ccffcc"
| 108 || August 5 || @ Reds || 10–6 || Jackson (4–3) || Capilla || — || 50,085 || 61–46
|- bgcolor="ffbbbb"
| 109 || August 6 || @ Reds || 3–8 || Seaver || Forster (3–4) || — || 44,267 || 61–47
|- bgcolor="ffbbbb"
| 110 || August 7 || @ Reds || 0–6 || Soto || Rooker (9–6) || — || 40,028 || 61–48
|- bgcolor="ccffcc"
| 111 || August 8 || Cubs || 7–6 || Jackson (5–3) || Reuschel || — || 25,802 || 62–48
|- bgcolor="ffbbbb"
| 112 || August 9 || Cubs || 1–4 || Burris || Reuss (7–11) || Hernandez || 28,341 || 62–49
|- bgcolor="ccffcc"
| 113 || August 10 || Cubs || 2–1 (18) || Demery (4–3) || Broberg || — || 32,831 || 63–49
|- bgcolor="ccffcc"
| 114 || August 11 || Mets || 9–1 || Jones (3–4) || Zachry || — || 9,260 || 64–49
|- bgcolor="ccffcc"
| 115 || August 12 || Mets || 3–2 || Rooker (10–6) || Koosman || — ||  || 65–49
|- bgcolor="ccffcc"
| 116 || August 12 || Mets || 6–5 (12) || Demery (5–3) || Siebert || — || 18,994 || 66–49
|- bgcolor="ccffcc"
| 117 || August 13 || Mets || 2–0 || Reuss (8–11) || Matlack || — || 32,212 || 67–49
|- bgcolor="ccffcc"
| 118 || August 14 || Mets || 6–3 || Candelaria (12–4) || Espinosa || Tekulve (4) || 17,945 || 68–49
|- bgcolor="ffbbbb"
| 119 || August 16 || @ Cubs || 5–6 (15) || Hernandez || Demery (5–4) || — || 24,039 || 68–50
|- bgcolor="ffbbbb"
| 120 || August 17 || @ Cubs || 2–4 || Reuschel || Rooker (10–7) || — || 29,786 || 68–51
|- bgcolor="ccffcc"
| 121 || August 18 || @ Cubs || 7–6 || Reuss (9–11) || Burris || Tekulve (5) || 24,027 || 69–51
|- bgcolor="ccffcc"
| 122 || August 19 || Giants || 6–1 || Candelaria (13–4) || Knepper || — || 16,831 || 70–51
|- bgcolor="ffbbbb"
| 123 || August 20 || Giants || 1–5 || Halicki || Jones (3–5) || — || 15,947 || 70–52
|- bgcolor="ffbbbb"
| 124 || August 21 || Giants || 4–5 || Lavelle || Gossage (7–8) || Moffitt || 32,232 || 70–53
|- bgcolor="ffbbbb"
| 125 || August 22 || Padres || 0–1 || Shirley || Rooker (10–8) || Fingers || 7,375 || 70–54
|- bgcolor="ccffcc"
| 126 || August 23 || Padres || 7–6 || Gossage (8–8) || Fingers || — || 8,105 || 71–54
|- bgcolor="ffbbbb"
| 127 || August 24 || Dodgers || 1–2 (10) || John || Gossage (8–9) || Garman || 20,018 || 71–55
|- bgcolor="ccffcc"
| 128 || August 25 || Dodgers || 2–1 || Candelaria (14–4) || Rau || Demery (1) || 17,164 || 72–55
|- bgcolor="ccffcc"
| 129 || August 26 || @ Padres || 3–1 || Kison (7–6) || Owchinko || Gossage (18) || 18,696 || 73–55
|- bgcolor="ccffcc"
| 130 || August 27 || @ Padres || 4–0 || Reuss (10–11) || Jones || — || 14,732 || 74–55
|- bgcolor="ccffcc"
| 131 || August 28 || @ Padres || 10–1 || Rooker (11–8) || Shirley || — || 10,371 || 75–55
|- bgcolor="ccffcc"
| 132 || August 30 || @ Giants || 3–1 || Candelaria (15–4) || Montefusco || — || 12,699 || 76–55
|- bgcolor="ffbbbb"
| 133 || August 31 || @ Giants || 3–6 || Barr || Kison (7–7) || — || 4,267 || 76–56
|-

|- bgcolor="ffbbbb"
| 134 || September 2 || @ Dodgers || 2–10 || Hooton || Reuss (10–12) || — || 39,276 || 76–57
|- bgcolor="ffbbbb"
| 135 || September 3 || @ Dodgers || 4–6 || Sutton || Rooker (11–9) || Garman || 44,505 || 76–58
|- bgcolor="ffbbbb"
| 136 || September 4 || @ Dodgers || 2–8 || John || Jones (3–6) || — || 36,686 || 76–59
|- bgcolor="ccffcc"
| 137 || September 5 || Phillies || 3–1 || Candelaria (16–4) || Lerch || Gossage (19) ||  || 77–59
|- bgcolor="ffbbbb"
| 138 || September 5 || Phillies || 1–11 || Carlton || Kison (7–8) || — || 40,423 || 77–60
|- bgcolor="ccffcc"
| 139 || September 6 || Phillies || 5–4 (11) || Gossage (9–9) || Garber || — || 15,136 || 78–60
|- bgcolor="ccffcc"
| 140 || September 7 || Cardinals || 5–4 || Forster (4–4) || Denny || Tekulve (6) || 7,219 || 79–60
|- bgcolor="ccffcc"
| 141 || September 8 || Cardinals || 9–5 || Demery (6–4) || Eastwick || Gossage (20) || 4,848 || 80–60
|- bgcolor="ffbbbb"
| 142 || September 9 || Expos || 1–2 || Dues || Jones (3–7) || Stanhouse || 7,628 || 80–61
|- bgcolor="ffbbbb"
| 143 || September 10 || Expos || 2–4 || Twitchell || Candelaria (16–5) || Kerrigan || 7,697 || 80–62
|- bgcolor="ccffcc"
| 144 || September 11 || Expos || 10–4 || Kison (8–8) || Holdsworth || — || 9,470 || 81–62
|- bgcolor="ffbbbb"
| 145 || September 12 || @ Phillies || 2–6 || Christenson || Reuss (10–13) || — || 42,145 || 81–63
|- bgcolor="ccffcc"
| 146 || September 13 || @ Phillies || 2–0 || Rooker (12–9) || Kaat || Gossage (21) || 42,638 || 82–63
|- bgcolor="ccffcc"
| 147 || September 15 || @ Cardinals || 4–3 || Candelaria (17–5) || Rasmussen || Gossage (22) ||  || 83–63
|- bgcolor="ffbbbb"
| 148 || September 15 || @ Cardinals || 7–10 || Sutton || Demery (6–5) || Eastwick || 9,081 || 83–64
|- bgcolor="ffbbbb"
| 149 || September 16 || @ Expos || 0–5 || Schatzeder || Kison (8–9) || Stanhouse || 7,026 || 83–65
|- bgcolor="ccffcc"
| 150 || September 17 || @ Expos || 6–3 || Whitson (1–0) || Landreth || Gossage (23) || 12,674 || 84–65
|- bgcolor="ccffcc"
| 151 || September 18 || @ Expos || 7–5 (11) || Tekulve (10–1) || Rogers || — || 25,097 || 85–65
|- bgcolor="ccffcc"
| 152 || September 20 || @ Mets || 4–2 || Candelaria (18–5) || Espinosa || — || 3,372 || 86–65
|- bgcolor="ccffcc"
| 153 || September 21 || @ Mets || 4–0 || Kison (9–9) || Koosman || Gossage (24) || 5,044 || 87–65
|- bgcolor="ccffcc"
| 154 || September 23 || @ Cubs || 2–0 || Rooker (13–9) || Hernandez || Gossage (25) || 3,757 || 88–65
|- bgcolor="ccffcc"
| 155 || September 24 || @ Cubs || 7–3 || Forster (5–4) || Broberg || Jackson (3) || 14,970 || 89–65
|- bgcolor="ccffcc"
| 156 || September 25 || @ Cubs || 4–0 || Candelaria (19–5) || Reuschel || — || 17,815 || 90–65
|- bgcolor="ffbbbb"
| 157 || September 27 || Mets || 1–7 || Espinosa || Kison (9–10) || — || 3,379 || 90–66
|- bgcolor="ccffcc"
| 158 || September 28 || Mets || 3–2 || Rooker (14–9) || Swan || Gossage (26) || 2,673 || 91–66
|- bgcolor="ccffcc"
| 159 || September 29 || Mets || 5–2 || Forster (6–4) || Medich || Tekulve (7) || 2,504 || 92–66
|- bgcolor="ccffcc"
| 160 || September 30 || Cubs || 3–1 || Candelaria (20–5) || Reuschel || — || 8,507 || 93–66
|-

|- bgcolor="ccffcc"
| 161 || October 2 || Cubs || 5–1 || Jones (4–7) || Burris || Jackson (4) ||  || 94–66
|- bgcolor="ccffcc"
| 162 || October 2 || Cubs || 3–2 || Gossage (10–9) || Lamp || — || 20,418 || 95–66
|-

|-
| Legend:       = Win       = LossBold = Pirates team member

Opening Day lineup

Notable transactions 
 June 7, 1977: Wayne Tolleson was drafted by the Pirates in the 12th round of the 1977 Major League Baseball Draft, but did not sign.
 June 15, 1977: Ed Kirkpatrick was traded by the Pirates to the Texas Rangers for Jim Fregosi.
 July 27, 1977: The Pirates traded a player to be named later to the Seattle Mariners for Dave Pagan. The Pirates completed the deal by sending Rick Honeycutt to the Mariners on August 22.
 August 18, 1977: Doug Frobel was signed by the Pittsburgh Pirates as an amateur free agent.

Roster

Player stats

Batting

Starters by position 
Note: Pos = Position; G = Games played; AB = At bats; H = Hits; Avg. = Batting average; HR = Home runs; RBI = Runs batted in

Other batters 
Note: G = Games played; AB = At bats; H = Hits; Avg. = Batting average; HR = Home runs; RBI = Runs batted in

Pitching

Starting pitchers 
Note: G = Games pitched; IP = Innings pitched; W = Wins; L = Losses; ERA = Earned run average; SO = Strikeouts

Other pitchers 
Note: G = Games pitched; IP = Innings pitched; W = Wins; L = Losses; ERA = Earned run average; SO = Strikeouts

Relief pitchers 
Note: G = Games pitched; W = Wins; L = Losses; SV = Saves; ERA = Earned run average; SO = Strikeouts

Awards and honors 
1977 Major League Baseball All-Star Game
 Dave Parker, outfield, starter
 John Candelaria, reserve
 Goose Gossage, reserve

Farm system

Notes

References 
 1977 Pittsburgh Pirates team page at Baseball Reference
 1977 Pittsburgh Pirates team page at www.baseball-almanac.com

Pittsburgh Pirates seasons
Pittsburgh Pirates season
Pittsburg